Bellas Artes is a Caracas Metro station on Line 1. It was opened on 27 March 1983 as part of the extension of Line 1 from La Hoyada to Chacaíto. The station is between Parque Carabobo and Colegio de Ingenieros.

The station is located next to the National Art Gallery, hence the name.

References

Caracas Metro stations
1983 establishments in Venezuela
Railway stations opened in 1983